The 1986–87 John Player Special Cup was the 16th edition of England's premier rugby union club competition at the time. Bath won the competition for the fourth consecutive year defeating Wasps in a repeat of the previous year's final. The event was sponsored by John Player cigarettes and the final was held at Twickenham Stadium.

Draw and results

First round

Second round

Away team progress*

Third round

Away team progress*

Fourth round

Quarter-finals

Semi-finals

Final

References

1986–87 rugby union tournaments for clubs
1986–87 in English rugby union
RFU Knockout Cup